Rhopalolemma rotundiceps is a species of cuckoo bee in the family Apidae. It is found in North America.

References

Further reading

 

Nomadinae
Articles created by Qbugbot
Insects described in 1997